El Sueño de Morfeo (English: Morpheus' Dream) was a Spanish band from Asturias. Their musical style is pop rock fused with Celtic, folk rock and indie pop elements. 
They represented Spain at Eurovision Song Contest 2013 with the song "Contigo hasta el final (With you until the end)".

History

2002: Beginnings as Xemá 
The band was originally formed in 2002 under the name Xemá, with a clear influence of Asturian folk music. Their debut album, Del interior, was released that same year, but failed to generate commercial success. This album was recorded while David Feito, from Asturias himself, and Raquel del Rosario, from the Canary Islands, were at the Colegio Internacional Meres in Siero, Asturias, together with teachers Andrés Alonso (keyboard and accordion) and Antón Fernández (bass guitar and guitar). After the launch of this first album, the band had to decide if they would go on as Xemá or create a new project, opting for the latter.

2003–2006: "1+1 son 7" and El Sueño de Morfeo 
After Juan Luis Suárez joined David and Raquel in 2003, they decided to find a new name for the band. They considered names like "Pupitre Azul" (Blue Desk) or "La Hija del Caos" (The Daughter of Chaos), and eventually chose El Sueño de Morfeo.

In 2004, Raquel auditioned for the Spanish TV series Los Serrano and gave a demo of their songs. The production company Globomedia asked them to cover the theme song of the series, "1+1 son 7", together with Fran Perea in an episode that would air on 30 July 2004. The group received a significant push in their career from this appearance. They received a recording deal from the music branch of the production company, Globomedia Música.

Their first album as El Sueño de Morfeo, an eponymous album, came out in March 2005, produced by Manel Santisteban. Their first single "Nunca volverá" had been released in January 2005, becoming an instant sales hit in Spain. It ranked third on the year-end singles chart. Their following singles, "Ojos de cielo," "Okupa de tu corazón" and "Esta soy yo" cemented their popularity. They toured Spain with more than 100 concerts and they did a promo tour through Latin America. That same year they took part in a tribute album to Duncan Dhu, where they covered "Una calle de París".

In 2006, they recorded a cover of "I Will Survive" for a Cruzcampo spot, titled "Tómate la vida". Raquel recorded a duet with Diego Martín, "Déjame verte", and El Sueño de Morfeo recorded the Spanish version of "Our Town", "Reencontrar", for the Spanish edition of the Cars Movie Soundtrack. The launch campaign of television channel La Sexta featured them as well, with their song "Sonrisa especial".

2007–2008: Nos vemos en el camino 

The third studio album, second as El Sueño de Morfeo, Nos vemos en el camino, was recorded during 2006, and released in April 2007. One of the album tracks, "Un tunel entre tú y yo", was presented in a further appearance on Los Serrano. The first single from that album was "Para toda la vida", followed by "Demasiado tarde".

The two following singles were collaborations with Nek: "Para ti sería" and "Chocar". The album was re-issued with a DVD and including new tracks and the collaborations with Nek. The band toured through Spain in 2007 and did a mini-tour in 2008 as well.

2009–2010: Cosas que nos hacen sentir bien 
In early 2009, they recorded a new album in Los Angeles. Its first single, "Si no estás" was released in April 2009 and the album, Cosas que nos hacen sentir bien, in May 2009. The first single was followed by "No sé dónde voy" and "Gente". The band toured Spain in 2009 and 2010. In 2010, they collaborated with Cómplices, recording one of their most popular songs, "Es por ti", for their 20th anniversary album.

2011–2012: Buscamos sonrisas 
In early 2011, they collaborated with La Musicalité in a new song, "Cuatro elementos", which was number 9 on the Spanish Singles Chart. In February 2011, Raquel competed together with Luca Barbarossa in the 2011 Sanremo Music Festival, where they finished in 8th place with his composition "Fino in fondo".

Their 4th album as El Sueño de Morfeo, titled Buscamos sonrisas was recorded in Los Angeles, produced by Thom Russo. It was released in February 2012, with the first single "Depende de ti" released in advance in mid-November 2011. After releasing the album, the band began a tour of acoustic concerts through Spain in theatres and auditoriums.

2013: Eurovision Song Contest and Todos tenemos un sueño
On 17 December 2012, it was revealed that the band had been internally chosen by national broadcaster RTVE to represent Spain in the Eurovision Song Contest 2013 to be held in Malmö, Sweden, where they competed as ESDM, their acronym. The band presented four candidate songs for the contest. Their Eurovision entry was selected through a special televised live show that was aired on 26 February. "Contigo hasta el final" was chosen by 50% jury and 50% televote. Eventually, in the Eurovision Song Contest hosted in Malmö, Sweden, the song was voted only by 2 countries (Albania and Italy) and ranked 25th from 26 acts participating.

"Contigo hasta el final" and the other three candidate songs for the Eurovision Song Contest were included in a new album titled Todos tenemos un sueño, that was released on 7 May 2013. This album mostly consists of collaborations with famous artists such as Pastora Soler, Álex Ubago, Laura Pausini, La Musicalité and Giorgina covering El Sueño de Morfeo's most popular songs.

Members
Vocals: Raquel del Rosario
Acoustic guitar and backing vocals: David Feito Rodríguez
Electric guitar: Juan Luis Suárez Garrido

Collaborators
Violin: Belinda Álvarez López
Bass: Javi Méndez
Drums: Israel Sánchez
Bagpipes and whistle: Ricardo Soberado

Discography

Albums

Studio albums

Singles

As lead artist

Featured singles

Other appearances

Music videos
 «Nunca volverá» (2005)
 «Okupa de tu corazón» (2005)
 «Ojos de cielo» (2005)
 "Dejame verte" (feat. Diego Martin, 2005)
 "Reencontrar" (the Cars soundtrack, 2006)
 «Para ti sería» (feat. Nek) (2007)
 «Ésta soy yo» (2008)
 «Demasiado tarde» (2008)
 «Para toda la vida» (2008)
 «Chocar» (feat. Nek) (2008)
 «Gente» (2009)
 «Si no estás» (2009)
 «No sé donde voy» (2009)
 «Ven» (2010)
 «Cuatro elementos» (feat. La Musicalité, 2010)
 «Depende de ti» (2011)
 «Lo mejor está por llegar» (2012)
 «Contigo hasta el final» (2013)

Awards and nominations

References

External links

Official website
El Sueño de Morfeo at Allmusic

El Sueño de Morfeo at Discogs

 
Asturian music
Spanish pop music groups
Eurovision Song Contest entrants of 2013
Eurovision Song Contest entrants for Spain
Musical groups established in 2002
2002 establishments in Spain
Articles containing video clips